Rudolph Joseph Migay (November 18, 1928 – January 16, 2016) was a Canadian ice hockey forward. He played for the Toronto Maple Leafs of the National Hockey League between 1949 and 1959.

Playing career
Migay turned professional in 1948. He spent three years with Pittsburgh's American Hockey League (AHL) club before joining the National Hockey League (NHL)'s  Toronto Maple Leafs for a seven-year tenure. This was followed by a couple of years in Rochester and later two seasons in Denver. With both knees considerably weakened by numerous collisions, Rudy moved into coaching with the Tulsa Oilers in the Central Hockey League (CHL) and later with other teams.

Migay coached the following teams - 
Rochester Americans  AHL 1962-1963,
Tulsa Oilers CHL 1964-1965,
Amarillo Wranglers CHL 1968-1969,
Baltimore Clippers  AHL 1969-1970,
Amarillo Wranglers CHL 1970-1971.
The Wranglers were a farm team for the NHL  Pittsburgh Penguins.

Personal life
He was brother-in-law to the first Stanley Cup winner of Slovak descent, Pete Backor who played for Toronto Maple Leafs. Migay himself was also of Slovak descent, having both parents born in what is today Slovakia (Orava region). Migay died January 16, 2016, at the age of 87.

Career statistics

Regular season and playoffs

See also
 List of NHL players who spent their entire career with one franchise

References

External links
 

1928 births
2016 deaths
Buffalo Sabres scouts
Canadian ice hockey centres
Canadian people of Slovak descent
Denver Invaders players
Ice hockey people from Ontario
Pittsburgh Hornets players
Pittsburgh Penguins scouts
Rochester Americans players
Sportspeople from Thunder Bay
Toronto Maple Leafs players
Toronto St. Michael's Majors players
Tulsa Oilers (1964–1984) players